Babiana longicollis is a species of plant in the family Iridaceae. It is endemic to Namibia.

References

Flora of Namibia
longicollis
Least concern plants
Taxonomy articles created by Polbot
Taxa named by Kurt Dinter